The Southern Conference Men's Soccer Freshman of the Year is an annual award given the most outstanding freshman soccer player in the Southern Conference. The award has been given since 1992. 

Several players have gone on to have illustrious professional careers that have won this award. Notable examples include Clint Dempsey, Drew Moor and Walker Zimmerman.

Winners 

 1992: Bill Kaushagen
 1993: Kevin Turner
 1994: Rich Daughtridge
 1995: Ronnie Pascale
 1996: Peter Slobodyan
 1997: David Buehler
 1998: Matt Goldsmith
 1999: Soren Johnson
 2000: McNeil Cronin
 2001: Clint Dempsey
 2002: Drew Moor
 2003: Scott Jones
 2004: Matt Smith
 2005: Kiki Willis
 2006: Jon Cox
 2007: Haris Cekic
 2008: Coleton Henning
 2009: Chris Thomas
 2010: Andy Craven
 2011: Walker Zimmerman
 2012: Nestor Jaramillo
 2013: Bobby Edet
 2014: Will Bagrou
 2015: Leeroy Maguraushe
 2016: Joe Pickering

References 

College soccer trophies and awards in the United States
Player of the Year
Awards established in 1992
College sports freshman awards
Southern Conference